The Dorset Regiment was a line infantry regiment of the British Army in existence from 1881 to 1958, being the county regiment of Dorset. Until 1951, it was formally called the Dorsetshire Regiment, although usually known as "The Dorsets". In 1958, after service in the Second Boer War along with World War I and World War II, the Dorset Regiment was amalgamated with the Devonshire Regiment to form the Devonshire and Dorset Regiment. In 2007, it was amalgamated with the Royal Gloucestershire, Berkshire and Wiltshire Regiment, The Light Infantry and the Royal Green Jackets to form a new large regiment, The Rifles.

History
The Territorials in Dorset trace their origins to the 1st Administrative Battalion, Dorsetshire Rifle Volunteers formed at Dorchester.  Its first formation consisted of the following: The first volunteer corps in Dorset had their headquarters in Dorchester. The 1st Dorsetshire Rifle Volunteer Corps (1 Dorsetshire RVC) was at Bridport, 2 Dorsetshire RVC at Wareham, 3 Dorsetshire Rifle Volunteer Corps at Dorchester, 4th Dorsetshire RVC at Poole, 5 Dorsetshire RVC at Weymouth, 6 Dorsetshire RVC at Wimborne, 7 Dorsetshire RVC at Sherborne, 8 RVC at Blandford, 9 Dorsetshire RVC – Shaftesbury, 10 Dorsetshire RVC at Sturminster, 11 Dorsetshire Rifle Volunteer Corps at Gillingham, and 12 Dorsetshire RVC at Stalbridge.

Eventually in 1880 as a result of the Childers Reforms the regiment was re-designated to the 1st Dorsetshire Rifle Volunteers.  Just a year later it moved under control of the Dorsetshire Regiment as the volunteer battalion.

Early history
The Dorsetshire Regiment was established in the Regular Army in 1881 under the Childers Reforms by the amalgamation of the 39th (Dorsetshire) Regiment of Foot and the 54th (West Norfolk) Regiment of Foot. The 1st Battalion was stationed in Malta from 1888, in Egypt from 1889, and in British India from 1893, where it took part in operations in the Tirah Campaign on the North West Frontier in 1897–98.

The 2nd Battalion was stationed in Ireland from 1893 to 1897, then in Malta from 1899. Following the outbreak of the Second Boer War in late 1899, they were sent to South Africa, participating in the Relief of Ladysmith. The battalion stayed in South Africa throughout the war, which ended in June 1902 with the Peace of Vereeniging. Four months later 300 officers and men left Cape Town on the SS German in late September 1902, and arrived at Southampton in late October, when they were posted to Portland.

In 1908, the Volunteers and Militia were reorganised nationally, with the former becoming the Territorial Force and the latter the Special Reserve; the regiment now had one Reserve battalion and one Territorial battalion.

First World War

During the First World War, nine hostilities-only battalions were formed, six battalions serving overseas. The 1st Battalion and 6th (Service) battalion served on the Western Front throughout most of the war. Additional battalions (1/4th Battalion, 2/4th Battalion and 3/4th Battalion) were formed as part of the Territorial Force to meet the demand for troops on the Western Front.

Regular Army
The 1st Battalion was in Belfast when war broke out: it landed at Le Havre in August 1914 forming part of the 15th Brigade in the 5th Division. It transferred to 95th Brigade in the 32nd Division in December 1915 and to the 14th Brigade in the same Division in January 1916.

The 2nd Battalion was in Poona, India, when war broke out and was shipped, as part of the 16th Indian Brigade, to Mesopotamia, where it was trapped in the Siege of Kut and captured by the Turks. (Of the 350 men of the battalion captured, only 70 survived their captivity.) During the siege, returning sick and wounded, and the few replacements who had been sent out, were unable to re-join their battalion, so they, and similar drafts of the 2nd Norfolk Regiment, were amalgamated into a scratch battalion forming part of the force attempting to relieve Kut. This battalion was formally titled the Composite English Battalion, but was more commonly known as The Norsets; it was broken up in July 1916, when the 2nd Dorsets was re-constituted. The battalion then served in Egypt as part of 9th Indian Brigade in the 3rd Indian Division.

Territorial Force
The 1/4th Battalion of the Territorial Force served in India and Mesopotamia and 2/4th Battalion in India and Egypt.

New Army
The 5th (Service) Battalion took part in the Gallipoli Campaign, and having been evacuated from there in December 1915, went to Egypt before joining the war on the Western Front in July 1916. The 6th (Service) Battalion was shipped to Boulogne in France in July 1915 as part of 50th Brigade in the 17th (Northern) Division and saw action on the Western Front.

After First World War and Anglo-Irish War
On 7 February 1920 4th Battalion was reformed in the Territorial Army with its headquarters in Dorchester and four companies (A–D).

The 3/4th Reserve Battalion was moved to Ebrington Barracks in Derry in April 1918. In April 1920, during the Anglo-Irish War, soldiers from the regiment fired into a protesting crowd on Bridge Street, leading to riots and skirmishes which saw it fight alongside the Royal Irish Constabulary (RIC) and (later) Ulster Volunteers (UVF) against the Irish Republican Army (IRA). Sporadic violence in the city continued until another large engagement in June, when the Dorsets and the UVF attacked the Bogside area of the city. A large IRA counter-offensive from the west ended the disturbances, which had seen 40 people killed since April. Some RIC officers threatened to resign over the Dorsets' fraternisation and co-operation with the UVF.

Malabar Campaign

In Summer 1921, the 2nd Battalion served under the command of Major-General John Burnett-Stuart, General Officer Commanding Madras District in India, where he was involved in the suppression of the Moplah Rebellion at Malabar between 1921 and 1922. The riots that they quashed were inspired by 10,000 guerrillas and led to 2,300 executions.

The Officers and Men from the Dorset Regiment who lost their lives while taking part in the suppression of the revolt are commemorated in a brass tablet at the St. Mark's Cathedral, Bangalore.

Second World War
In the Second World War, the regiment expanded to eight battalions.

The 1st Battalion was a regular army unit and part of the 231st Infantry Brigade, alongside the 1st Hampshires and 2nd Devonshires, for the duration of the war, fighting in Malta between 1940 and 1942, Sicily in August 1943, and Italy in September 1943. The 1st Dorsets landed on Gold Beach on D-Day in June 1944 as a part of the 50th (Northumbrian) Infantry Division and fought with the division in the Battle of Normandy and North-West Europe, until the division was withdrawn in late 1944 and used as a training division. The battalion had troops 327 killed and 1,029 wounded.

The 2nd Battalion was also a regular army unit and was part of the 5th Infantry Brigade, 2nd Infantry Division, throughout the war, participating in the Battle of France and the Dunkirk evacuation in 1940. In 1944, it took part in the Battle of Kohima during the Burma Campaign of 1944–1945, still with the 2nd Division.

The 4th Battalion was an original 1st Line Territorial Army unit and, in 1939, raised a 2nd Line duplicate, the 5th Battalion, when the Territorial Army was doubled in size prior to the commencement of the war. The 4th and 5th Battalions were both part of 130th Infantry Brigade in the 43rd (Wessex) Infantry Division, participating in the Normandy Campaign, Operation Market Garden and the Rhine Crossing.

The 30th Battalion, previously the 6th (Home Defence) Battalion, was with the 43rd Infantry Brigade in North Africa and the invasion of Sicily, after which it spent the rest of the war in Gibraltar.

The 7th Battalion, which was raised in 1940, was later converted to the 110th Light Anti-Aircraft Regiment, Royal Artillery. The regiment served with the 43rd (Wessex) Division in North-West Europe from June 1944 to May 1945.

The 8th Battalion, which was also raised in 1940 as 50th (Holding) Battalion, was initially assigned to the 210th Independent Infantry Brigade (Home) and was on home defence. Later, the battalion converted to the 105th Light Anti-Aircraft Regiment, Royal Artillery. The regiment was sent to North Africa in late 1942 and fought with the British First Army, It later served in the Italian Campaign supporting US Fifth Army.

Post war and amalgamation
In 1958, the regiment amalgamated with the Devonshire Regiment to form the Devonshire and Dorset Regiment.

Regimental museum
The regimental collection is displayed in the Keep Military Museum in Dorchester.

Battle honours
The regiment was awarded the following battle honours. Those from the two World Wars that are emblazoned on the Queen's Colour are indicated in bold:
 From 39th Regiment of Foot: Plassey, Gibraltar 1779–83, Albuhera, Vittoria, Pyrenees, Nivelle, Nive, Orthes, Peninsula, Maharajpore, Sevastopol
 From 54th Regiment of Foot: Marabout, Egypt, Ava
 Martinique 1794 (awarded in 1909 for service of the 39th Regiment), Tirah, Relief of Ladysmith, South Africa 1899–1902
 The Great War (13 battalions): Mons, Le Cateau, Retreat from Mons, Marne 1914, Aisne 1914, La Bassée 1914, Armentières 1914, Ypres 1915 '17, Gravenstafel, St. Julien, Bellewaarde, Somme 1916 '18, Albert 1916 '18, Flers-Courcelette, Thiepval, Ancre 1916 '18, Arras 1917, Scarpe 1917, Messines 1917, Langemarck 1917, Polygon Wood, Broodseinde, Poelcappelle, Passchendaele, St. Quentin, Amiens, Bapaume 1918, Hindenburg Line, Épéhy, Canal du Nord, St. Quentin Canal, Beaurevoir, Cambrai 1918, Selle, Sambre, France and Flanders 1914–18, Suvla, Landing at Suvla, Scimitar Hill, Gallipoli 1915, Egypt 1916, Gaza, El Mughar, Nebi Samwil, Jerusalem, Tell 'Asur, Megiddo, Sharon, Palestine 1917–18, Basra, Shaiba, Kut al Amara 1915 '17, Ctesiphon, Defence of Kut al Amara, Baghdad, Khan Baghdadi, Mesopotamia 1914–18
 The Second World War: St. Omer-La Bassée, Normandy Landing, Villers Bocage, Tilly sur Seulles, Caen, Mont Pincon, St. Pierre La Vielle, Arnhem 1944, Aam, Geilenkirchen, Goch, Rhine, Twente Canal, North-West Europe 1940 '44–45, Landing in Sicily, Agira, Regalbuto, Sicily 1943, Landing at Porto San Venere, Italy 1943, Malta 1940–42, Kohima, Mandalay, Mt. Popa, Burma 1944–45

Victoria Cross
The following member of the regiment was awarded the Victoria Cross:
 Private (later Corporal) Samuel Vickery, Tirah Campaign

Regimental colonels
Colonels of the regiment were:
 1881–1889 (1st Battalion): Gen. John Ramsay Stuart, CB
 1881–1892 (2nd Battalion only to 1889): Gen. Sir Charles Thomas van Straubenzee, GCB
 1892–1894: Lt-Gen. Robert John Eagar, CB
 1894–1903: Gen. Henry Ralph Browne, CB
 1903–1909: Lt-Gen. Sir Matthew William Edward Gosset, KCB
 1909–1910: Lt-Gen. Lindsay Farrington
 1910: Maj-Gen. William de Wilton Roche Thackwell, CB
 1910–1922: Maj-Gen. Henry Cook, CB
 1922–1933: Maj-Gen. Sir Arlington Augustus Chichester, KCMG, CB, DSO
 1933–1946: Maj-Gen. Sir Hubert Jervoise Huddleston, GCMG, GBE, CB, DSO, MC
 1946–1952: Brig. Charles Hall Woodhouse, OBE, MC
 1952–1958: Maj-Gen. George Neville Wood, CB, CBE, DSO, MC
 1958 Regiment amalgamated with The Devonshire Regiment to form the Devonshire and Dorset Regiment

Gallery

References

Further reading
 C.T. Atkinson, The Dorsetshire Regiment: the Thirty-Ninth and Fifty-Fourth Foot and the Dorset Militia and Volunteers (Oxford : Privately printed at the University Press, 1947).

 
Infantry regiments of the British Army
Military units and formations in Dorset
Military units and formations established in 1881
Regiments of the British Army in World War II
Regiments of the British Army in World War I
Military units and formations disestablished in 1958
1881 establishments in the United Kingdom
R